Rainer Gerhards (born March 11, 1967) is a German software engineer, network engineer, and protocol designer best known for his Computer data logging work including Rsyslog and Reliable Event Logging Protocol. He began developing Rsyslog in 2004, to forward log messages in an Internet Protocol Network from UNIX and Unix-like computer systems. In 1988, Gerhards founded the company RG Informationssysteme, which was later rebranded as Adiscon GmbH in 1997.

Life and career
Gerhards was born in Geilenkirchen, Germany. In 1983 he started professional computing on Univac 1100 mainframes. He was appointed as the head of data center of Dörries GmbH (member of Voith group) where he introduced a company-wide PC network and was among the first in Germany to utilize Windows in larger-scale environments.  In 1996, he started work on  Computer data logging, and developing network and protocol software based on it.

Protocol Design
Gerhards focused on the IETF syslog standardization and authored four RFCs  on syslog. He wrote the base RFC 5424, which describes the syslog protocol architecture and stack. As a board member of Mitre's CEE effort, he worked on standardizing event expression formats and providing interoperability between different logging systems.
 
He implemented , the syslog over  protocol. Later, Gerhards designed the Reliable Event Logging Protocol, and its predecessor Simple Event Transport Protocol (SETP).

Open Source Projects
In 2004, he started working on rsyslog project and later on other open source logging projects, including Project Lumberjack, Adiscon LogAnalyzer, liblogging, and librelp  on Linux system logging infrastructure. From 1988, he had started working on the open source projects during his early career.
He wrote a library for portable graphics as well as a portable data exchange tool (cugcpio) and released it as public domain software. This code was distributed on Diskette by the C User's Group.

Closed Source Projects
In 1996, Gerhards wrote the first syslog server for Windows, that was launched by his company, Adiscon. In 1997 he wrote the first ever Windows Event Log to syslog forwarding tool  and invented this class of software. The tool EventReporter never made a  prominent share in the market, but was a base for Gerhards and other developers to create similar tools. While developing this tool further, Gerhards designed a forwarding tool for Microsoft Internet Information Server log files, based on a paper by him and Dr. Tina Bird.

References

External links 
 Personal Blog

German computer scientists
1967 births
Living people